Vrhovlje is a small village above Lukovica pri Domžalah in the eastern part of the Upper Carniola region of Slovenia.

References

External links

Vrhovlje on Geopedia

Populated places in the Municipality of Lukovica